Arrabalera may refer to:
 Arrabalera (1950 film), an Argentine musical drama film
 Arrabalera (1951 film), a Mexican comedy drama film